Conflict of Heroes (CoH) is a tactical-level board wargame series that simulates firefights at the platoon or company level. Several games and expansions have been released in the series including, Price of Honour set in Poland in 1939, Awakening the Bear!, set in the World War II Eastern Front between the years 1941 and 1942, Storms of Steel, set in Kursk in 1943 and Guadalcanal, set on Guadalcanal in 1942. The game is played on one or more interchangeable map boards which are divided into hexagons for movement and firing regulation.

The first game in the Conflict of Heroes series, Awakening the Bear!, is a 2009 Origins Silver Award Winner for the Best Historical Board Games category. A jury of experts drawn from the Academy of Adventure Gaming Arts & Design and the Game Manufacturers Association’s (GAMA) three divisions select the top ten of the submitted games and present them to game store retailers in attendance at the GAMA Trade Show in April each year.

Introduction
The game has been hailed as an excellent addition to the available wargame lineup in that Conflict of Heroes uses simplified rules compared to some other wargames such as Advanced Squad Leader. It is easy for beginners to learn and games can be quite short if all players are experienced. The game can accommodate up to four players, but many of the included firefight scenarios are only designed for two players.

Game Components
The games contain 1" square cardboard counters, depicting either a military unit or a game related token. Units include infantry squads, assault squads, machine gun teams, mortar teams, tanks, and heavy weapons. Events such as artillery strikes and extra weapons, as well as game features are included on action cards. Also included are map boards with terrain features such as lakes, buildings, hills, forests, roads, etc.

Gameplay
Conflict of Heroes differs from many board wargames in that it allows players to instantly react to almost any action by the opponent. On the active player's turn, he/she activates one unit. That unit is given seven action points (APs) (although there are rule variants on the number of APs given per unit) which it can use to move, pivot, fire or build defenses if it has that capability. Each unit, upon activation, receives their APs, but each unit can only be activated once per turn, and each player can only activate one unit during his/her active period. Because of this, play is passed quickly back and forth between players. After any given unit has used all its APs, it is marked at 'used' and cannot be activated again that turn.

In addition to the APs that each unit receives, each player receives an amount of Command Action Points (CAPs) that can be used at any time to move/fire units that are not active, supplement an active unit's APs, or modify a dice roll. After each action by the active player, the inactive player is given a chance to respond one time with one unit. He may use his CAPs in the same manner as APs to fire with or move a unit, or he may choose to use an 'opportunity action', whereby he is allowed to give a unit any single action, but that unit is marked as used after completing the action. After the inactive player is given the chance to respond, the active player continues with his/her turn as normal. The active player is not bound to using strictly APs either, he/she may use CAPs and opportunity actions in between, before, or after using APs, as long as the inactive player is given a chance to respond to every action.

This rule set allows for a very involved gameplay that leaves little downtime for either player. Many of the other rules in the game are similar to other board wargames, but they are often simplified for ease of teaching and for making the game more fun.

Notes

External links
academygames.com
Conflict of Heroes: Awakening the Bear! - Russia 1941-42 at Boardgamegeek
Conflict of Heroes: Storms of Steel - Eastern Front 1943-45 at Boargamegeek

World War II board wargames
Tactical wargames